The discography of American hip hop artist MF Grimm consists of seven studio albums (including two collaborations), three EPs, three mixtapes and two compilation albums. Although MF Grimm's rapping career began in the late 1980s, his debut record did not come until 2000 in the form of the MF EP, a collaborative project with MF Doom. Grimm had previously executive produced MF Doom's debut solo album Operation: Doomsday, as well as aiding with the mixing and recording, on top of having a solo track on the project. Grimm's debut album, The Downfall of Ibliys: A Ghetto Opera was released in 2002. The third collaborative project with Drasar Monumental in the Good Morning Vietnam series was released November 25, 2014. Grimm's discography is also notable in that his album American Hunger is the first triple disc album of original material by a solo hip hop artist.

On February 4, 2015, it was announced that a compilation of love songs would be released for Valentines Day. This compilation is slated to be called "MF Love Songs" and will cover the majority of Grimm's career.

On March 15, 2021, MF Grimm released The Hunt For The Gingerbread Man 2: Get The Dough produced by Darko the Super, premiering an animated music video for the track Candy Rain (Falling Down) directed by NutzenTV.

Studio albums

Collaborative releases

Compilation albums

Mixtapes

Singles

Other appearances

References

MF Grimm albums